Phyllarachne is a monotypic genus of Indonesian dwarf spiders containing the single species, Phyllarachne levicula. It was first described by Alfred Frank Millidge & A. Russell-Smith in 1992, and has only been found on the Borneo.

See also
 List of Linyphiidae species (I–P)

References

Linyphiidae
Monotypic Araneomorphae genera
Spiders of Asia